Igor Olegovich Protasov (born 16 January 1964) is a Russian professional football coach and a former player.

Club career
He made his Russian Football National League debut for FC SKA Khabarovsk on 6 May 1992 in a game against FC Amur Blagoveshchensk. He played 3 seasons in the FNL for SKA and FC Luch Vladivostok.

External links
 

1966 births
Living people
Soviet footballers
Russian footballers
Association football forwards
FC Luch Vladivostok players
FC SKA-Khabarovsk players
Russian football managers
FC SKA-Khabarovsk managers